Constantine Papadakis (February 2, 1946 – April 5, 2009) was a Greek-American businessman and the president of Drexel University.

Academic career
Papadakis received his diploma in Civil engineering from the National Technical University of Athens in Greece. He came to the United States in 1969 to continue his studies in civil engineering and earn his master's degree from the University of Cincinnati. He then went on to earn his doctorate in civil engineering in 1973 from the University of Michigan.

Papadakis served as head of the civil engineering department at Colorado State University and then dean of University of Cincinnati's College of Engineering prior to 1995. He was appointed President of Drexel University in Philadelphia, Pennsylvania in 1995 and held that position until his death in 2009. During his tenure, Papadakis doubled the full-time undergraduate enrollment, tripled freshman applications, quintupled the university's endowment, and quintupled research funding. His salary of $805,000 was the sixth highest among university presidents. After his death Papadakis' total earnings, including life insurance payout, was estimated at over $4 million.

Other activities
Papadakis sat on the Philadelphia Stock Exchange as chairman of the compensation committee. He also served on the board of trustees of the Hellenic College and Holy Cross Greek Orthodox School of Theology.

Death

Papadakis died at the Hospital of the University of Pennsylvania from pulmonary complications due to pneumonia on April 5, 2009 after battling lung cancer for months. He was 63 years old.

Sources
 Lily Bita, Constantinos Papadakis, beside to his office, the statue of Sappho. "Apodemon Epos" Magazine of European Art Center (EUARCE) of Greece, 1st issue 1997 p. 3-4

References

External links

Drexel University Office of the President
The Dragon Slayer
President Constantine Papadakis Exclusive The Triangle

1946 births
2009 deaths
Businesspeople from Philadelphia
American people of Greek descent
University of Cincinnati alumni
University of Michigan College of Engineering alumni
National Technical University of Athens alumni
Deaths from lung cancer in Pennsylvania
20th-century American businesspeople
Businesspeople from Athens
20th-century American academics